Justin Van Der Volgen is an American musician, mixer with Out Hud from 1996 to 2005 and with !!! from 1996 to 2007.

Van der Volgen remixed Maserati's "Inventions" for their 2008 Inventions Remixed 12" on Temporary Residence.

References 

American male musicians
American audio engineers
Remixers
Year of birth missing (living people)
Living people
!!! members